Jean Antonio Tome    (born December 23, 1991) is a Brazilian baseball infielder. He plays for the Atibaia Baseball Club in the Brazil Baseball League. He had earlier played for Seattle Mariners rookie league teams from 2007-2009. He represented Brazil at the 2013 World Baseball Classic.

References

External links

Baseball America

1989 births
2013 World Baseball Classic players
Arizona League Mariners players
Brazilian baseball players
Brazilian expatriate baseball players in the United States
Brazilian expatriate sportspeople in Venezuela
Living people
Sportspeople from São Paulo (state)
Pulaski Mariners players
Venezuelan Summer League Mariners players
Brazilian expatriate baseball players in Venezuela
People from Atibaia